As with the federal government of Russia Ivanovo Oblast government is also divided into three branches: executive, legislative and judicial. The Charter of Ivanovo Oblast form the provincial law.

Composition of the government

Government Session

Government Office

Structural units 

 General Legal Department
 Department of Civil Service and Personnel
 Control management
 Documentation Management Department
 Anti Corruption Authority
 Office of Budget Planning and Accounting
 Regional Security Administration
 Protocol Management
 Logistics Management
 Office of the press service
 Department of Coordination of the Infrastructure Development Complex
 Coordination Department of the Social Sphere Complex
 Department of Coordination of the Complex of Economic Development
 Coordination Office of the Construction Complex
 Department of Coordination of the Complex of Housing and Public Utilities and Energy
 Management of Coordination of the Property Management and Procurement Complex
 Division to ensure the activities of the Commissioner for Human Rights
 Division to ensure the activities of the Governor
 Sector to ensure the activities of the Commissioner for the Protection of the Rights of Entrepreneurs
 Mobilization Department
 Department of Information Technology
 Public Procurement Division
 Sector of State Secret Protection and Special Documentary Communication
 Information Security Team
 Staff of Anti Terrorist Commission
 Office of the Situational Center of the Governor of the Ivanovo Oblast
 Representation of the Government of the Ivanovo Oblast in Moscow City

See also 

 Ivanovo Oblast
 Charter of Ivanovo Oblast
 Ivanovo Oblast Duma

External links 
http://www.ivanovoobl.ru/  (Official government website of Ivanovo Oblast; available in English/Russian)
Government of Russia by federal subject
Politics of Ivanovo Oblast